Suiticide (2007) is Pour Habit's second full-length album, originally self-released, and has been re-released through Fat Wreck Chords in 2009.

Track listing

"Institution"
"Light The Torch"
"Against Me"
"Resignation"
"Misfigured"
"Bad Luck Drunk"
"Evolution"
"You Suck" (only on the 2007 release)
"Hell Bent"
"Zion"
"Real Eyes"
"Suiticide"
"Tomahawk" (Japanese bonus track)
"Gutterblock Boy" (Japanese bonus track)

2009 albums
Fat Wreck Chords albums
Pour Habit albums